The Bangladesh Army is commanded by the Chief of Army Staff who is a four star general. Under the command of Army Headquarters, Bangladesh Army has 10 divisions with area  commands. Divisions are commanded by major generals. In addition, there are several independent brigades commanded by a brigade commander in the rank of brigadier general. The army has also one training command which is titled as the Army Training and Doctrine Command commanded by a Lieutenant General.

Formations

Army Headquarters, Dhaka Cantonment
 Independent Brigades & Units who directly report to Army Headquarters 
 6th Independent Air Defence Artillery Brigade (Mirpur Cantonment)
 7th Independent Air Defence Artillery Brigade
 14th Independent Engineer Brigade
 46th Independent Infantry Brigade
 86th Independent Signals Brigade
 Bangladesh Military Contingent to Kuwait
 Para Commando Brigade
 Army Aviation Group
 34 Engineer Construction Brigade
 24 Engineer Construction Brigade
 Army Security Unit (ASU)
 Logistics Area 
 Army Military Police Unit
 Base Supply Depot, Dhaka
 Army Supply and Transport Battalion (Army ST Bn)
 Central Ordnance Depot (COD)
 901 Central Workshop EME
 902 Central Workshop EME
 Central Ammunition Depot (CAD)
 Central Mechanical Transport Depot (CMTD)
 Combined Military Hospital (CMH), Dhaka
 Combined Military Hospital, Rajendrapur
 Military Dental Centre, Dhaka
 Station Headquarters, Dhaka
 Station Headquarters, Rajendrapur
 Adhoc Station Headquarters, Mirpur Cantonment
 Logistics Area Military Police Unit
 Inspectorate of General Stores & clothing (IGS&C)
 Inspectorate of Vehicle  & Engineering Equipment (IV&EE)
 Inspectorate of Electrical Equipments & Instruments (IE&I)
 Inspectorate of Armaments & Explosives (IA&E)
 Adhoc Overseas Operations Logistics Depot (AOOLD)

Army Training and Doctrine Command, headquartered at Mymensingh Cantonment
 Bangladesh Military Academy (BMA)
 School of Infantry and Tactics (SI&T)
 Bangladesh Institute of Peace Support Operation Training (BIPSOT)
 Artillery Centre and School (AC&S)
 Armoured Corps Centre and School (ACC&S)
 Bangladesh Infantry Regimental Centre (BIRC)
 East Bengal Regimental Centre (EBRC)
 Engineer Centre and School of Military Engineering (ECSME)
 Signals Corps Training Center and School (STC&S)
 Army Medical Corps Centre and School (AMCC&S)
 School of Electrical Mechanical Engineering
 Ordnance Center and School (OC&S)
 Army Service Corps Centre and School (ASCC&S)
 School of Military Intelligence (SMI)
 Army School of Music
 Army School of Physical Training and Sports (ASPTS)
 Army School of Education and administration (ASEA)
 Corps of Military Police Centre and School (CMPC&S)
 Army Wargame Centre (AWGC)
 403th Battle Group
Army Printing Press

Barishal Area, Headquartered at Sheikh Hasina cantonment
 7th Infantry Division HQ
 7th Artillery Brigade
 6th Infantry Brigade
 28st Infantry Brigade

Savar Area, headquartered at Savar Cantonment
 9th Infantry Division HQ
 9th Artillery Brigade
 71st Mechanized Brigade
 81st Infantry Brigade
 99th Composite Brigade (Padma Cantonment)

Cox's Bazar Area, headquartered at Ramu Cantonment
 10th Infantry Division HQ
 10th Artillery Brigade
 2nd Infantry Brigade
 65th Infantry Brigade
 97th Infantry Brigade

Bogura Area, headquartered at Majhira Cantonment
 11th Infantry Division HQ
 11th Artillery Brigade (Jahangirabad Cantonment)
 93rd Armoured Brigade
 26th Infantry Brigade 
 111th Infantry Brigade

Sylhet Area, headquartered at Jalalabad Cantonment
 17th Infantry Division HQ
 17th Artillery Brigade
 11 Infantry Brigade
 52nd Infantry Brigade
 360th Infantry Brigade

Ghatail Area, headquartered at Shahid Salahuddin Cantonment
 19th Infantry Division HQ
 19th Artillery Brigade
 309th Infantry Brigade
 77th Infantry Brigade (Mymensingh Cantonment)
 98th Composite Brigade (Jamuna Cantonment)

Chattogram Area, headquartered at Chattogram Cantonment
 24th Infantry Division HQ
 24th Artillery Brigade (Guimara Cantonment)
 69th Infantry Brigade (Bandarban Cantonment)
 203rd Infantry Brigade (Khagrachari Cantonment)
 305th Infantry Brigade (Rangamati Cantonment)

Cumilla Area, headquartered at Moynamoti Cantonment
 33rd Infantry Division HQ
 33rd Artillery Brigade
 44th Infantry Brigade
 101st Infantry Brigade

Jashore Area, headquartered at Jashore Cantonment
 55th Infantry Division HQ
 55th Artillery Brigade
 21st Infantry Brigade
 88th Infantry Brigade
 105th Infantry Brigade

Rangpur Area, headquartered at Rangpur Cantonment
 66th Infantry Division HQ
 66th Artillery Brigade (Kholahati Cantonment)
 16th Infantry Brigade
 72nd Infantry Brigade
 222nd Infantry Brigade (Saidpur Cantonment)

References 

 Barthorp, Michael. 1979. Indian Infantry Regiments, 1860-1914. Osprey Publishing. 
 Official Website of Bangladesh Army

Bangladesh Army
 
Bangladesh military-related lists